James Richard Leininger (born 1944) is an American physician, businessman and conservative and Christian activist from San Antonio, Texas.

Biography

Early life and education
Reared in Indiana and Florida, Leininger attended Indiana University in Indianapolis, from which he received a Bachelor of Arts in 1965 and an M.D. in 1969. Following a two-year internship at the Leonard M. Miller School of Medicine at the University of Miami in Coral Gables, Florida, he completed post-graduate courses at the Center for Disease Control in Atlanta, Georgia, Brooke Army Medical Center in San Antonio, Walter Reed Army Institute of Research in Washington, D.C., and Fort Sam Houston in San Antonio, where he also lectured. He later settled in San Antonio and taught at the University of Texas Health Science Center from 1972-1973.

Business

In 1976, Leininger founded Kinetic Concepts, a global medical technology corporation, on whose board he later served as chairman emeritus. One of his Kinetic Concepts employees, Susan Weddington of San Antonio, was from 1997 to 2003 the state chairman of the Republican Party of Texas.

His other business ventures include the private venture investment firm MedCare Investment Funds in 1991, the co-founding of ATX Technologies in 1994 (later serving on its board of directors), and co-founding the Renal Care Group in 1995. He has served as director for the Emergency Department of the Baptist Health System in San Antonio (1975-1986) and on the board of directors for Texas Commerce Bank (1985-1991). He currently sits on the boards of BioNumerik Pharmaceuticals and Spurs Sports & Entertainment.

Leininger has also invested in Texas real estate and food companies, such as Promised Land Foods, Sunday House Foods, Seafood Wholesalers of Houston, and Plantation Seafood Co. He owns the direct mail firm Focus Direct, Inc. and the television station Mission City Television, Inc. Additionally, he is a part-owner of the San Antonio Spurs.

He is a member of the American Medical Association, the Texas Medical Association, and the Institute of American Entrepreneurs. In 2007, he was inducted into the Texas Business Hall of Fame.

Political activism

Leininger founded Texans for Justice in 1988, the Texas Public Policy Foundation in 1989, and has been involved with Texans for Governmental Integrity. He supported Thomas R. Phillips' campaign for Chief Justice of the Texas Supreme Court and has made significant donations to George W. Bush (while governor of Texas), former Governor Rick Perry, and the state Republican Party.

Christian activism
Leininger is a self-described devout Christian and has been described as "an extremist" by his political opponents, a label which he describes as being "a sad commentary on where politics is today." On the other hand, 1994 Republican nominee for Texas lieutenant governor Tex Lezar has said of Leininger that "[h]e believes in putting his time, effort and money behind things he believes in[.] . . . I've never sensed an ulterior motive for Jim. It's all philosophical."

Leininger sits on the board of Patrick Henry College, founded in Virginia by the conservative activist Michael Farris. A proponent of school vouchers, Leininger launched CEO San Antonio to award vouchers to children from modest backgrounds. He also sits on the board of directors of CEO America, another school voucher organization. He is a former board member of the Carver Academy. He owns the copyright for The Beginner's Bible, as well.

Philanthropy
In addition to political contributions, Leininger supports a range of charitable initiatives in areas including education, humanitarian aid, and scientific research. In 1997, he reportedly donated $1.5 million to Vanderbilt University, $2.5 million to Vision Forum, $3 million to the University of Miami, and $300,000 for diabetes research to the University of Texas Medical Center. Other recipients include Boy Scouts of America, Habitat for Humanity, the American Red Cross, the Mental Health Association, YMCA, The Miracle Foundation, along with orphanages in India, Romania, Central America, Haiti, Ukraine, Russia, Myanmar, Thailand, and thirteen countries in Africa.

Personal life
Married in 1976, Leininger and his wife, Cecelia, have four children and five grandchildren.

Bibliography
Daniel and the Lions (The Beginner's Bible) (1996)
Adam and Eve (The Beginner's Bible) (1997)
Noah's Great Adventure (The Beginner's Bible - Great Bible Adventure) (1997)
The Beginner's Bible: The Prodigal Son (1997)
The Beginner's Bible: Jesus Calls His Disciples (co-written with Lisa S. Reed, Kelly R. Pulley, 1997)
Favorite Bible Heroes (The Beginner's Bible) (1998)
David and Goliath (Beginner's Bible) (1998)
Bible Stories for Little Ones: Beginner's Bible (1998)
Noah's Big, Big Boat (1998)
David's Great Battle: Beginner's Bible (1998)
The Beginner's Bible, Favorite Bible People (1999)
Jonah and the Big Fish (1999)
Joseph's Book of Colors (The Beginner's Bible) (1999)
Adam's Counting Book (1999)
Noah's Ark (The Beginner's Bible Tab Book Series) (2000)
The Life of Moses (The Beginner's Bible - First Bible Words) (2000)
Jonah and the Whale (The Beginner's Bible) (2000)

References

1944 births
Living people
People from Warsaw, Indiana
Indiana University alumni
University of Texas at Austin faculty
University of Miami alumni
People from San Antonio
Physicians from Texas
Businesspeople from Texas
American philanthropists
Texas Public Policy Foundation people
Texas Republicans
Activists from Texas